Kuruvilla Pandikattu Joseph, SJ,  (कुरुविला पांडिक्काट्ट or കുരുവിള പാണ്ടിക്കാട്ട്) (born November 28, 1957) is an Indian Jesuit priest. He is Chair Professor of JRD Tata Foundation on Business Ethics at XLRI, Jamshedpur and Professor of Philosophy, Science and Religion at Jnana Deepa, Institute of Philosophy and Theology, Pune, Maharashtra, India. He is also Director of JDV Centre for Science-Religion Studies (JCSR) and Association of Science, Society and Religion (ASSR), Pune.

He has authored/edited 36 books and written more than 160 academic articles. He is also a co-founder and has been a co-publisher of two journals, Jnanadeepa: Pune Journal of Religious Studies and AUC: Asian Journal of Religious Studies. Furthermore, he has organized more than 40 academic conferences. His weekly column on "Contemporary Spirituality" used to appear on Tuesdays in Financial Chronicle for eight years He has been contributing regularly to both academic and popular journals.

He is involved in science-religion dialogue and science-related activities and teaches courses on them as well. His areas of interest (and specialization) include: Science-Religion Dialogue; Philosophical Anthropology (Emerich Coreth); Hermeneutics (Paul Ricœur) and Inter-religious dialogue (Bede Griffiths).

Philosophical approach
The starting points of Pandikattu's academic research are physics, philosophy (metaphysics) and religion (theology). He became interested in the quest for the unification of the fourfold forces of nature in physics and the hermeneutics of dialogue by Paul Ricoeur. This led him to explore the interpretive and symbolic (or mythic) nature of religious experience and inspired his first doctoral thesis: "Idols to die, so that symbols might live". He traces the idol-symbol tension back to every aspect of human experience.

Human Being: Between Before and Beyond 
Evoking the tensional and paradoxical life of human beings, he holds on to a dynamic and humanistic understanding of the human beings, who transcends their own self-understanding and definitions. Human being is the tensional appropriation between the past and the future, the memory and hope, the actual and the potential. It is in this tensional existence that human beings realis their own ever evolving nature, including that of bound freedom and limited relationship.  As bound freedom they are finite beings seeking the infinite. Experiencing limited love, they want to widen the horizon of understanding. Based on the concrete experiences of pleasure they are open to the infinite bliss, that remains open and ever elusive.

Thus he concludes that humans are free, to a very limited extent. This limited freedom provides him with the dignity and worth that they possess. They are capable of genuine love, also to a very limited extent, and establishing relationships, in spite of the contrary claims and experiences.

Death: Live It! 
As part of the dynamically tensional existence, human beings are “being-unto-death,” where the possibility of their own impossibility is always at the horizon.  At the same time, he is convinced that  only "Once you learn how to die, you learn how to live" (Mitch Albom). ' 
Further, following  Michel de Montaigne  we may hold that “To philosophize is to learn to die.”  So as humans beings we are called to live gratefully and accept death gracefully!
The paradox of life is when we recognise the depth of life, we also experience the depth of death!
Further, as human beings we need to take seriously the possibility of our own collective annihilation (Sixth Mass Extinction, Ecological Crises, etc.) or enhancement (Artificial Intelligence, Technological Singularity, Moral Creativity, etc.).

Dialogue: Ever Approachable, Never Attainable 
For him, Human life is a dialogical encounter, where we approach the other more and more, but never exhaustively. Ours is always an asymptotic relationship that keeps on growing and does not achieve the fullness. In a dialogical mode, we are in the process, collectively, of realising our own selves. It is a challenging and painstaking process, demanding acceptance (of the past mistakes), forgiveness and readiness to reconcile.
Pandikattu considers the dialogical dimension of not only of religions, but also of the human existence. His second doctoral thesis on Bede Griffiths was published under the title"Dialog as Way of Life."  He also took up issues in science-religion dialogue, which according to him is "not an option but an obligation" for the very survival of the human species, believing it called for radial commitment. Two main areas of his research are physical immortality and a viable or sustainable lifestyle.
He is convinced that genuine and painful dialogue is the only way forward for human community.

From such a dialogical aspect the whole reality is dialogical. The infinite or God (also referred to as "The Reality") is our human life's enticing and elusive dimension. God is ever-approachable, but never attainable exhaustively. Like the horizon, which invites and recedes from us, God is always near and far at the same time. He bases this insight on scientific details like the lowest temperature reachable (t →0) and knowing that the beginning of Big Bang (T →0) is like the "horizon" which is never fully attainable.

Pandikattu says that the dialogical reality is relational and at the same time paradoxical. The paradox of love is that when two people, who have accepted their own emptiness and recognize their own nothingness, affirm each other, there emerges authentic love that is infinite. Thus, when one truly looks at reality and accepts its nothingness (even absurdity), there emerge traces of infinity. That is the paradoxical beauty of love and of our existence.

Further, he pleads for a culture of dialogue between traditions, religions, nations and among science and religion.  Without such dialogue, our human destiny is threatened. It is very challenging to enter into a dialogue with those who do not want it or are inimical to our world view, he acknowledges.  Still he believes that dialogue is the only way of life for contemporary society.

Major Activities
Pandikattu has been actively involved in science-religion dialogue. He is interested in looking at both science and religion critically and creatively, so that they can enrich each other and humanity. In this area he has delivered numerous lectures, written numerous articles and books and organised conferences.

Journals
 Editor, Jnanadeepa: Pune Journal of Religious Studies
 Editor, AUC: Asian Journal of Religious Studies

Books

Scholarly Books (16)
Ethcis, Artificial Intelligence and Human Destiny: Our Collective Search.  Christian World Imprints.  Delhi.  2021. pp. xviii+306.
Time’s Up! The Story of Time Weaving Physics and Philosophy.   Christian World Imprints.  Delhi.  2021. pp. xviii+166.
Finding God in Everything: Spiritual Insights into Finding Everything in God.    ISPCK, Delhi. 2021. pp. 270.
Light for Life: Spiritual Insights for Contemporary World. 2020.  
 Ever Approachable, Never Attainable: Science-Religion Dialogue in India. 2016.  
 Gratefully and Gracefully: Scientific and Religious Reflections on Death and Beyond. 2014. 
 Elusive Transcendence: An Exploration of the Human Condition Based on Paul Ricoeur. 2014. 
 Between Beneath, Before and Beyond: An Exploration of the Human Condition Based on Paul Ricoeur. 2013.  Read Review Article
The Human Search: Issues in Philosophical Anthropology. 2011. Surplus, Subversion, Submission: A Contemporary Study of Paul Ricoeur's Symbol, Metaphor and Parable. 2011. 
 The Bliss of Being Human: Science and Religion for Self-realisation. 2004. 
 Religion@scientist.com. Pune: Jnanam, 2001.
 Religious Dialogue as Hermeneutics: Bede Griffiths' Advaitic Approach. Cultural Heritage and Contemporary Change Series Iiib, South Asia Vol 3. Washington: Research in Values and Philosophy, 2001.
 Dialogue as the Way of Life: Bede Griffiths’ Attempt at Integrating Religions, Cultures and Sciences. Mumbai: Zen Publications, 2001. 
 Meaning through Science and Religion. Pune: JDV, 2000.
 Idols to Die, Symbols to Live: Dynamic Interaction between Language, Reality and the Divine. New Delhi: Intercultural Pub, 1999. 
  Metaphorising of Reality. Pune: Jnana-Deepa Vidyapeeth, 1997. .

Edited Scholarly Books (28)Ethics, Sustainability and Fratelli Tutti: Towards a Just and Viable World Order Inspired by Pope Francis. Ethics International Press, Inc.  Encounter and Experience: Enabling an All-Inclusive World-Church, Inspired by Professor Lothar Lies, SJ. ISPCK, New Delhi. 2021. pp. xxxiv + 432. 
 Have Courage, I am with You: Christian Responses to COVID-19. 2020. 
 Fully Human and Fully Alive: Essays on Being Human Today in Honour of Dr Cyril Desbruslais SJ. 2020.
 Fully Spiritual, Fully Human - Fostering Diverse Spiritual Experiences: Essays in Honour of Dr Stephen Chundanthadam SJ. 2020. 
 The Philosophy of God: Faith and Traditions. 2019. 
 Logic and Love: Reflecting on Professor John Vattanky's Contribution to Indian Philosophy and Spirituality. 2019.  
 Everything is Interrelated: Christian Trinity and Hindu Advaita as Experienced by Raimundo Panikkar and Francis D'Sa SJ. 2019. 
 Metaphysics: Philosophy of Be-ing for Today. 2019. 
 Melodies from the Flute: Dialogue among Religions and Cultures. 2019. 
 Epistemology and Phenomenology of Religions: Creative Insights into Intercultural and Interreligious Dialogue. 2018. 
 The Indian Ending: Rediscovering the Grandeur of Indian Heritage for a Sustainable Future : Essays in Honour of Professor Dr. John Vattanky SJ on Completing Eighty Years. 2013. 
 The Philosophy of Liberation: Revisiting Genuine Religious Experiences with Special Reference to Christianity. 2017. 
 The Dancing Peacock: Indian Insights into Religion and Development. 2010. Depth of Death Scientific Insights Religious Openness. 2010. 
 Dancing to Diversity: Science-Religion Dialogue in India. 2008. 
 Lifting up the Spirit, Uplifting the Body: Interfacing Religion, Spirituality and Social Work in India. Pune: Samajdarshan Prakashan, 2013. Edited with Suresh Pathare. 
 Committed to the Church and the Country: Reflections on Christian Living in India in Honour of Professor Kurien Kunnumpuram SJ. Delhi: ISPCK, 2013. Edited with James Ponniah and Thomas Kuriacose. 
 Postmodernity: An Indian Appraisal. 2008. 
 Reasons for Hope: Its Nature, Role and Future. (Cultural Heritage and Contemporary Change Series IIIB, South Asia Vol 10) Washington: Research in Values and Philosophy, 2005.
 Gandhi, Ganga, Giriraj.  Ahmedabad: Navajivan Pub, 2004.(associate editor with Lachman M. Khubchandani & Siddharth N. Bhatt) 
 Bend Without Fear: Hopes and Possibilities for an Indian Church: Essays in Honour of Professor Kurien Kunnumpuram SJ. New Delhi: ISPCK, 2003. Edited with Rosario Rocha. 
 
 Hopefully Yours... Pune: Jnanam, 2002 (CD).
 Let Life Be. Pune: Jnanam, 2002 (CD).
 Dreams and Visions: New Horizons for an Indian Church: Essays in Honour of Professor Kurien Kunnumpuram SJ. Pune: JDV, 2002. Edited with Rosario Rocha 
 Human Longing and Fulfilment: East Encounters West. Pune: JDV, 2002 (with Josef Quitterer).
 Gandhi: The Meaning of Mahatma for the Millennium. (Cultural Heritage and Contemporary Change Series Iiib, South Asia Vol 5.) Washington: Research in Values and Philosophy, 2001. 

Popular Books (18)
 Insights from LOVE and LOGIC. Christian World Imprints, New Delhi, 2016. .
 Insights from SCIENCE and SILENCE. Christian World Imprints, New Delhi, 2016..
 Insights from REASON and RELIGION. Christian World Imprints, New Delhi, 2015. .
 Insights into SCIENCE and SPIRITUALITY Christian World Imprints, New Delhi, 2014..
 JOY: Share It! Jnanam, Pune, 2017. .
 LIFE: Relish It! Mumbai: Better Yourself Books, St. Paul, 2012. .
 LOVE: Be It! Mumbai: Better Yourself Books, St. Paul, 2009. .
 DEATH: Live It! Jnanam & Media House, Pune & New Delhi, 2005..
 FREEDOM to Free.Delhi:Media House. 2004. .
 (Ed.) The Wisest of All Times is NOW Timeless Quotes on Time.  Jnanam. Pune.  2021. pp. 90.
 (Ed.) The What and So What of the God Particle.Pune: JDV Centre for Science-Religion Studies, 2012.
 Life as Love. New Delhi: Media House, 2005 (Revised edition of Promises of Love). .This Too will Pass Away! The Scientific Explanation and Religious Experience of Time Based on Michael Ende's Momo. Jnanam, Pune: 2003. .
 Promises of Love. Jnanam, Pune: 2003. TAMAS (There Are Many Alternative Stories). Mumbai: World-Web-Life, 2002..
 Promises of Life (with K. Suriano) New Delhi: Media House, 2001. .
 (Ed.) Pope Francis on Creation and Evolution Pune:  Jnanam & Association of Science, Society and Religion, 2014. . Booklet.
 (Ed.) Laudato Si': Reflections and Responses Pune: Jnanam & JDV Centre for Science-Religion Studies, 2015. . Booklet.

Book in His Honour (1) 
 Science-Religion Dialogue and Its Contemporary Relevance: Interdisciplinary Essays in Honour of Prof Dr Kuruvilla Pandikattu.'' Binoy Pickalakkattu (Ed). 2018.

Early life and influences
Pandikattu was born in Areekara, Kerala, India He was born to Uthuppan and Mary Joseph. He had his early education at Government LP School, Veliyannoor (1962–65) and St. Rockey's U.P. School, Areekara] (1965–70). Then he pursued his basic studies at Sacred Heart School, Changanassery, Kerala (1970–73), India.

After completing his School Secondary Leaving Certificate (S.S.L.C.) at Changanassery, he left for Guhiajori, Dumka, Bihar (now Jharkhand). Other places of his studies are: St. Xavier's School, Sahibganj (1976–78); Loyola College, Chennai (1978–81); St. Joseph's College, Trichy (1981–83); Jnana Deepa, Institute of Philosophy and Theology, Pune (1983–85), and University of Pune (1988–91).

References

External links 

1957 births
Living people
20th-century Indian Jesuits
Philosophers of science
Philosophers of religion
People from Kottayam district
Writers from Pune
21st-century Indian Roman Catholic theologians
20th-century Indian Roman Catholic theologians
Integral thought
Hermeneutists
20th-century Indian philosophers

Jesuit philosophers
21st-century Indian Jesuits